Calhoun is a ghost town in Cheyenne County, Kansas, United States.

History
Calhoun was issued a post office in 1886. The post office was discontinued in 1888.

References

Further reading

External links
 Cheyenne County maps: Current, Historic, KDOT

Former populated places in Cheyenne County, Kansas
Former populated places in Kansas